John Jay McKelvey (24 May 1863 – 19 October 1947) was an American author, attorney, and preservationist who set precedents in establishing the Harvard Law Review and in framing case law to craft the environs of his Spuyten Duyvil community, New York.

Biography 
John Jay (J.J.) McKelvey was born Sunday, 24 May 1863, in Sandusky, Ohio, to the parents of John McKelvey and Jane Rowland Huntington McKelvey.  J.J.'s paternal grandparents were Matthew McKelvey and Nancy Adams McKelvey, and his paternal great-grandparents were William McKelvey and Mary Toppings McKelvey along with Bildad Adams and Mary Hines Adams.  William McKelvey of Scotch-Irish American, Revolutionary War regality removed with an assembly after the war to the Western Reserve; where John McKelvey fashioned and financed Sandusky and a section of its first short line railroad, which was eventually enveloped by the Pennsylvania Railroad.  Whereas, J.J.'s maternal grandparents were Apollos Huntington and Deborah Rowland Huntington with his maternal great-grandparents being American Revolutionary War soldier Elisha Huntington and Esther Ladd Huntington and great-grandparents of the William Rowland lineage.  J.J.'s five siblings included:  Janet Huntington McKelvey Swift, Alice Rowland McKelvey Milne, Jennie Adams McKelvey, Charles Sumner McKelvey, and Ralph Huntington McKelvey.  J.J.'s sister Alice and father John helped document their family's English and Welsh pedigree, colonial ancestors, war-time service, and Fire Lands migration.

After successfully completing his college course, J.J. initially married Mary Clark Mattocks on 12 July 1887 in Cleveland, Cuyahoga County, Ohio, at the bride's childhood home.  Before settling into their described "Bonnie Brae" on the Hudson River at Spuyten Duyvil, J.J. and Mary visited her mother in Los Angeles, California to consolidate contiguous land for the completion of their estate on Palisade Avenue, New York City.  In J.J.'s household, he afforded Irish servants, and he and Mary had four girls:  Mary Alice McKelvey, Constance McKelvey, Ruth McKelvey, and Jane McKelvey.  Primarily J.J. lived and practiced law in New York City; though, he occasionally traveled for business or an excursion to Oberlin, Bermuda, or to Ricker's Hill-Top in Poland Spring, Maine.  Midlife, J.J. and Mary divorced; after which, he married Louise E. Brunning, 10 June 1914, and fathered three children:  Louise McKelvey, John Jay McKelvey Jr., and Robert Adams McKelvey.  After 1940, John Jay McKelvey was thought to have returned to his Lake Erie, Cleveland, Cuyahoga County, Ohio roots; however, he died Sunday, 19 October 1947 after a short illness in Northern Westchester Hospital, Mount Kisco, Westchester County, New York.  His family held his service at the previously popular Universal Funeral Chapel, Lexington Avenue and 52nd Street, New York City, Wednesday, the 22nd at 8:00 p.m.

Education 
John Jay McKelvey graduated from Sandusky High School, Ohio, with first honors during June 1880 and entered Oberlin College during September 1880, where he completed his undergraduate classical studies, June 1884, earning an A.B. degree.  Oberlin's writing guild and its oratory society, wherein he excelled, helped prepare him for ten hour days of studying law, moot court, and the Socratic Method at Harvard, where he began during the autumn of 1884.  By June 1887 he had graduated from Harvard with an A.M. degree from the College Department and a L.L.B. degree from the Law Department and cum laude credentials.

With further distinction, John Jay McKelvey founded the Harvard Law Review and served as its first editor-in-chief, during 1887.  To take the law review from idea to print, Chief McKelvey convinced law society mates to join his mission, and his intimate nucleus gaged the backing of Harvard professors and solicited subscription support from alumni.  With proper organization and logistics, the review went to press, and Chief McKelvey bolstered the Harvard Law Review success, by lobbying his circle of influence, including the Oberlin contingency and Harvard alumni of Boston and New York City.  Salesman, spokesman, organizer, chief, McKelvey essentially encouraged other law-truth-seekers to buy into the value of establishing the Harvard Law Review.

Attorney-at-Law
Admitted to the New York bar during 1888, initially John J. McKelvey began to practice law at 10 Wall Street in New York City, with Albert Stickney, Esquire and Edward Morse Shepard, Esquire of Stickney & Shepard, at the top of his bar history; after which, during 1889 John J. associated with DeLancey Nicoll, Esquire.  From 1890 to 1894, John J. worked as a solo practitioner at 45 William Street—the same office complex shared by then Grover Cleveland.  Between 1894 and 1895, John J. joined the law firm of Shepard, Terry, McKelvey, & Prentiss—a short-lived partnership, though fellow Harvard Law alumni Seth Sprague Terry would subsequently serve John J. as his counsel. John J. returned to practicing law alone, between 1895 and 1899.  With his brother-in-law Frederick W. Mattocks, John J. formed his second longest partnership, primarily practicing realty law from 1899 to 1906 at 66 Broadway.  John J.'s longest law partnership was between 1906-1914 with the firm of McKelvey & Favour at 84 William Street where Alpheus Hoyt Favour and associates drew denunciations and dismissals.  By 1919, John J. was displaying his own shingle, practicing law at 43 Cedar Street. John J. held his last partnership with McKelvey & Kennedy from 1926 to 1930 before finishing his solo law career, with an office at 36th West 44th Street and pleadings before the New York Supreme Court on behalf of his affluent clients.

Legal clients
Holding a dozen or so board memberships and principalship positions, John counseled officers of varied business entities, involving insurance underwriting, lumber, finance, politics, preservation, railroad, and voluminous realty issues.  His work as advocate and attorney presented opportunity to appear and champion his clients and their causes at several levels from local assessors' boards to the New York State Senate and New York Supreme Court to U.S. legislative hearings, and ultimately via U.S. Supreme Court pleadings.

Representing the Sandusky & Columbus Short Line Railway Company, John served as counsel and helped consolidate the railroad his father began.  Years later, John returned to the railway transit business, with the New York & Chicago Short Line, but his involvement with the Pan-American Transcontinental Railway Company could have unhinged an elite career.  Early to mid-career John began defending the risks and rights of lumber and insurance entities, and a New York City newspaper commentary listed John among a list of approximately 200 attorneys eligible and worthy to sit on the U.S. Supreme Court bench.  John's advocacy and appearance work augmented his travel and influence from Canada to California to the Roosevelt White House, 1904 and kept his name in wide-ranging newspapers and respected industry periodicals, as an authority, appearing alongside the names of entities such as these:
 East Side Lumber Company
 Lumbers Exporters' Association
 Lumber Insurance Company of New York
 Lumber Insurers General Agency
 National Wholesale Lumber Dealers' Association of America
 Adirondack Fire Insurance Company
 Toledo Fire and Marine Insurance Company of New York
 Federal Union Fire Insurance Company
Through the Park District Protective League, attorney McKelvey represented the realty rights and interests of wealthy landowners who lived along the Hudson River at Spuyten Duyvil.  He defended the residents against adverse possession, easements, eminent domain, unfair property assessments, etc.  With denials, fees, and decisions against the residents and their reserve, McKelvey switched tactics.  He moved from a protective mode to a preservationist mind frame.  McKelvey formed or managed companies, which he used to finesse the purchases of the Spuyten Duyvil estates from amiable residents and subsequently used the companies to control these multi-faceted realty transactions and help control urban growth.  McKelvey's strategy converted manor homes and grounds into multi-unit cottages, mostly upscale co-operatives, apartments, or studio homes.  McKelvey fashioned the residences after the character of the estate environs but named the abodes after French and British heroines Rosa Bonheur and Charlotte Brontë, with names such as the Villa Victoria, the Rosa Bonheur, and the Villa Brontë.  McKelvey primarily pushed his lasting strategy through the below five named collectives:

 Along-the-Hudson Company
 Edgehill Co-operative Savings and Loan Association
 Edgehill Terraces Company
 Industrial and Commercial Exhibition Company of New York
 Northern Realty Company
The landscape continued to change for the park residence district with the onslaught of WWI through the Great Depression, which amplified the pressure from urban developers, commissioners, and unabated assessors.  Along the pathway to resolving the grotesque vs. picturesque community character crisis, other creative landowners adopted McKelvey's strategy or a similar stance.

Legal cases
As the circa 1902 Nelson Bill took John Jay McKelvey's brand of advocacy to a U.S. Senate committee hearing, the land under water rights issue took John's pleadings to the U.S. Supreme Court, 1934.  John's voluminous case load encompassed commercial contracts, real property and corporation law.  However, John J.'s more noted (important) legal cases and/or counsel appearances were found with litigation that reached the New York Supreme Court.  See Further Reading section below.

Legal text
Though not technically a treatise like Wigmore's, McKelvey's key legal writings, especially his two most popular texts have been revised and re-released at several intervals:
 Principles of Common Law Pleading
 Handbook of the Law of Evidence
Like his books, McKelvey's journal article "The Law School Review, 1887 – 1937", which originally appeared in the Harvard Law Review, is available at libraries, in full text via on-line databases.  In 1917, McKelvey explained in retrospect, the Columbia Jurist was his inspiration for establishing a law review at Harvard.  McKelvey's April 1937 written assessment touched on the influence of the law review model and explained the founding purpose of the Harvard Law Review.  Metaphorically, McKelvey described the law school review as a pebble innocently tossed upon immeasurable water, with an effect beyond the initial pulsating ripple, unclear.  However, the organic quest for truth always yields fruit; thereby worthy of human effort toward fairness and justice, and as long as the law school review holds fast to honestly, genuinely, and thoughtfully pursuing truth, its purpose will be justified and fruitful and its existence sustained.

Legacy 
As early as 1901, concerned citizens began complaining about intruding patients from a nearby infirmary, meandering through their quaint neighborhoods, onto their verandas and lawns, loitering, and spitting phlegm. The complainants asserted that intruders were contaminating their vicinity and violating the local health department's "no spit rule," as well should be relocated along with the infirmary.  Publicly spitting phlegm in the Spuyten Duyvil community that derived its name from a Dutch phrase meaning spitting devil or the devil's spit ironically juxtaposes the gesture vs. symbolism. For decades the Spuyten Duyvil, Riverdale, Kingsbridge, and Hudson Park communities symbolized tranquil, picturesque manors, isolated for the influential, the industrialist, the informed who resented gestures of urban encroachment toward their enclaves of estate living.

From the turn of the century forward, residents like John Jay McKelvey crusaded with litigation and legislation against blight, destroying their park residence district; however, as stalwarts of the various neighborhood protection leagues died, capitulated, compromised, or continued with vigor, attorney McKelvey eventually countered, supplanting the platted grid of urban development and certain infrastructure, with his own brand of expansion.  McKelvey used realty buyouts to help defend and save his picturesque tranquility and launch his visionary Villa Charlotte Brontë (Villa Brontë), 1926. Critics carped McKelvey's myopic vision considered more his profit and seemingly was oblivious to the parallel plight of the nearby consumptives and the sanatorium.

Perhaps as John Jay McKelvey intended, Villa Brontë stands perched as a witness with dual vision—an eye toward the future unknown and an eye regarding preservation.  By strategically using realty law, commercial contracts, and corporation law, McKelvey created beautiful living, benefiting ensuing generations.  Through McKelvey's further legal engagement, he instrumentally developed Henry Hudson Monument, Along the Hudson Park, and Edgehill Terraces as part of the Spuyten Duyvil or Riverdale District, New York.

Legacy in Spuyten Duyvil
On April 23, 2020, two resolutions were affirmed by Bronx Community Board 8 to co-name the intersections of Bradley Terrace and Palisade Avenue in honor of John J. McKelvey Sr. and the intersection of Palisade Avenue between Independence Avenue and Edsall Avenue after the former Villa Rosa Bonheur.VRB1

Initially the co-naming resolutions were rejected by the then Council Member Andrew Cohen, but were later advanced by Council Member Eric Dinowitz to the NYC Council. On Dec. 15, 2021, the NYC Council voted in favor of a combined co-naming of the intersection of Palisade Avenue and Independence Avenue, at Bradley Terrace as "Palisade Avenue / John J. McKelvey Sr. Villa Rosa Bonheur Way".
 
On April 8, 2022, the street co-naming will be unveiled in a public ceremony, (hosted by Council Member Eric Dinowitz) successfully ending a three year effort by community activist Stephanie Coggins for the historic acknowledgment of the contributions of John J. McKelvey Sr. to Spuyten Duyvil and for preservation of the legacy of architectural gemstone Villa Rosa Bonheur, after its untimely and controversial demolition by a developer to build a apartment building. This demolition was in spite of the pronounced and extended outcry of the community.

Community involvement and membership
Mr. McKelvey practiced community building, finding clients, membership, and participation in numerous organizations, including those listed below:

Academia
 Oberlin College, Trustee Nominee
 Barnard School for Boys, Inc., Trustee
Arts
 American Museum of Natural History
 Metropolitan Museum of Art
Church
 Edgehill Church, Founder, Incorporator, Trustee, Spuyten Duyvil
Civic
 Hudson–Fulton Celebration Commission (Bronx, Contracts Committee)
 Henry Hudson Monument Association (Secretary, Fundraiser)
 Park District Protective League (Trustee)
Legal
 American Bar Association
 New York State Bar Association
 New York City Bar Association
 Harvard Law Association
Library
 Oberlin College Library (Book Collection & Monetary Donations)
Social
 Ardsley City (now Country) Club
 City Reform Club, New York City
 Harvard Club of New York City
 New York Oberlin Alumni Association

Politics and religion 
In print and in person McKelvey may have been described as an independent Democrat and Protestant who in theory politically backed free silver opponents but walked in practice with the capitalists and industrialists of his day, such as the Hearsts and Rockefellers.

References

Further reading
 Ontario Legislative Assembly. 1909. Sessional Papers 1st Session of 12th Legislature of the Province of Ontario. Volume 41, part 4. Toronto: L. K. Cameron. Archive.org/stream/n04ontariosession41ontauoft#page/n5/mode/2up.
 Ontario Legislative Assembly. 1910. Sessional Papers 2nd Session of 12th Legislature of the Province of Ontario. Volume 42, part I. Toronto: L. K. Cameron. https://archive.org/stream/n01ontariosession42ontauoft#page/n5/mode/2up.
 Moody Manual Company. 1916. 17th Annual Moody's Manual of Railroads and Corporation Securities. Volume II. New York: Moody Manual Company. http://hdl.handle.net/2027/umn.31951d00143056i.
 Mills, Don. 1906. Canada Lumberman, January 1905 – November 1906. Don Mills, Ontario: Southam Business Publications. https://archive.org/stream/canadianforest190506donm#page/n515/mode/2up.
 New York Times. 1894. "Wholesale Lumber Men Unite." New York Times. 21 November. http://newyorktimes.com/.
 New York Times. 1894. "Meeting of Lumber Dealers." New York Times. 13 December. http://newyorktimes.com/.
 Saint Paul Globe. 1898. "Annual Lumber Outbut." Saint Paul Globe (Saint Paul, Minnesota). 3 March. http://chroniclingamerica.loc.gov/lccn/sn90059523/1898-03-03/ed-1/seq-5/. 
 New York Daily Tribune. 1900. "Accused by Lumber Dealers." New York Daily Tribune. 10 May. http://chroniclingamerica.loc.gov/lccn/sn83030214/1900-05-10/ed-1/seq-16/.
 Omaha Daily Bee. 1902. "Lumber Scare, Prices High." Omaha Daily Bee (Omaha, Nebraska). 6 March. http://chroniclingamerica.loc.gov/lccn/sn99021999/1902-03-06/ed-1/seq-1/.
 New York Insurance Department. 1911.  Fifty-Second Annual Report of the Superintendent of Insurance of the State of New York: Reports on Official Examination of Insurance Companies Associations and Societies. Volume 2, part 5. Albany, New York: J. B. Lyons Company State Printers. http://hdl.handle.net/2017/coo.3192412707991.
 New York Senate. 1911.  Documents of the Senate of the State of New York, 134th Session. Volume 13, number 20, part 4. Albany, New York: J. B. Lyons Company State Printers. http://hdl.handle.net/2027/chi.74658065.
 New York Assembly. 1912. Documents of the Assembly of the State of New York, 135th Session. Volume 16, number 30, part 1. Albany, New York: J. B. Lyons Company State Printers.
 The G.H. Mortimer Publishing Company. 1903. Canada Lumberman. Toronto: G.H. Mortimer Publishing Company of Toronto, Limited. http://eco.canadian.ca/view/oocihm.8_04954_420/2?r=0&s=1.
 Insurance Journal Company. 1911. Hayden's Annual Cyclopedia of Insurance in the United States, 1909 – 1910. Hartford, Connecticut.: Insurance Journal Company. http://hdl.handle.net/2027/nyp.33433081624789.
 Oberlin College. 1913. "Election of Alumni Trustee." Oberlin Alumni Magazine 10, no. 01 (October): 12. http://hdl.handle.net/2027/mdp.39015075904279.
 Student Newspapers at the Five Colleges of Ohio. 1912. "Alumni to Elect Member of Board of Trustees." Oberlin Review 40, no. 06 (15 October): 1. http://dcollections.oberlin.edu/cdm/cdm/collection/p15963coll9/id/170724.
 Student Newspapers at the Five Colleges of Ohio. 1911. "Alumni Trustee Election Being Held This Month." Oberlin Review 39, no. 05 (6 October): 1. http://dcollections.oberlin.edu/cdm/ref/collection/p15963coll9/id/170388.
 Metropolitan Museum of Art Trustees. 1919. The Metropolitan Museum of Art Fiftieth Annual Report of the Trustees For the Year Ended 31 December 1919. New York: Metropolitan Museum of Art Trustees. http://hdl.handle.net/2027/mdp.39015062774578.
 Thompson, Frank. 1900. Review of the Association of the Bar of the City of New York. New York: Stumpf Steurer. .http://hdl.handle.net/2027/coo1.ark:13960/t42r4dc4f.
 Student Newspapers at the Five Colleges of Ohio. 1923. "Library Receives 16th Century Books." Oberlin Review 50, no. 62 (29 May): 1. http://dcollections.oberlin.edu/cdm/ref/collection/p15963coll9/id/174135.
 The College. 1903. Annual Reports of the President and the Treasurer, 1902 – 1903. Oberlin, Ohio: The [Oberlin] College. https://archive.org/stream/annualreportspr01collgoog#page/n8/mode/2up.
 Student Newspapers at the Five Colleges of Ohio. 1903. "Annual Meeting of the Oberlin Alumni Association of New York City." Oberlin Review 030, no. 31 (21 May): 26. http://dcollections.oberlin.edu/cdm/ref/collection/p15963coll9/id/16655.
 New York Tribune. 1910. "Recorded Mortgages, The Bronx." New York Tribune. 1 March. http://chroniclingamerica.loc.gov/lccn/sn83030214/1910-03-01/ed-1/seq-10/.
 New York Tribune. 1910. "Recorded Mortgages." New York Tribune. 25 May. http://chroniclingamerica.loc.gov/lccn/sn83030214/1910-05-25/ed-1/seq-12/.
 New York City Sun. 1913. "Satisfied Mortgages." New York City Sun. 14 August. http://chroniclingamerica.loc.gov/lccn/sn83030272/1913/-08-14/ed-1/seq-13/.
 New York City Sun. 1919. [omitted heading]. New York City Sun. 23 May. http://chroniclingamerica.loc.gov/lccn/sn83030431/1919/-05-23/ed-1/seq-15/.
 New York City Sun. 1919. [omitted heading]. New York City Sun. 5 September. http://chroniclingamerica.loc.gov/lccn/sn83030431/1919/-09-05/ed-1/seq-13/.
 New York Times. 1900. "To Conduct Expositions.  Bill to Incorporate Industrial and Commercial Exhibition Company of New York Introduced." New York Times. 13 March. http://newyorktimes.com/.
 Principles of Common Law Pleading
 Handbook of the Law of Evidence
 WikiTree. 2014. John Jay McKelvey (1863 – 1947).
 Lewis W. Douglas Papers, 1859 – 1974 (Bulk 1880 – 1960), University of Arizona Libraries, Special Collections, Box 20 for work product of McKelvey & Mattocks
 Case Law—Read More:
 Tradesmen's National Bank, Appellant vs. John W. Young and Others, Respondents 15 A.D. 109; 44 N.Y.S. 297, Supreme Court of New York, Appellate Division, Second Department, March Term 1897
 Samuel Wandelt, Respondent vs. Dillon B. Burnett, Appellant 22 Misc. 315; 49 N.Y.S. 109, Supreme Court, Appellate Term, January 1898
 John Jay McKelvey and Frederick W. Mattocks, Plaintiffs and Respondents vs. Louis G. DesGarets, Defendant and Francis Waddington, Defendant Appellant. 114 A.D. 913; 100 N.Y.S. 1128, Supreme Court of New York, Appellate Division, First Department, 1906
 Along The Hudson Company vs. Ayres 170 A.D. 218; 156 N.Y.S. 58, Supreme Court of New York, Appellate Division, First Department, 1915
 South American Securities Company vs. McKelvey 176 A.D. 729, Supreme Court of New York, Appellate Division, First Department, March 1917
 People of the State of NY vs. Zora Realty Company, et al. 128 Misc. 523; 220 N.Y.S. 40, Supreme Court, Bronx County, December 1926 Aff. 220 A.D. 825, Supreme Court of New York, Appellate Division, First Department, 1927
 People of the State of New York vs. Isaac G. Johnson and Company 219 A.D. 285, Supreme Court of New York, Appellate Division, First Department, 1927 Aff. 245 NY 627; 157 N.E. 885, Court of Appeals of the State of New York, 1927
 Lojo Realty Company, Inc. vs. Estate of Isaac G. Johnson, Inc. Aff. 253 NY 579; 171 N.E. 791, Court of Appeals of the State of New York, April 1930
 In the Matter of Isaac G. Johnson and Company, Respondent vs. People of the State of New York, Appellant 226 A.D. 882; 235 N.Y.S. 820; Aff. 253 N.Y. 535; 171 N.E. 771, Court of Appeals of the State of New York, March 1930
 Walter Winchester Cox, Helen Cox, et al., Petitioners vs. NY Central Railroad Company and City of New York 265 N.Y. 411; 193 N.E. 251, 105 A.L.R. 1378, November 1934

External links
 Ardsley Country Club
 Barnard School for Boys
 City Reform Club Records
 Columbia Jurist
 DeLancey Nicoll Papers 1890s
 Democrats
 Edward M. Shepard 
 Edward M. Shepard's Lecture
 Firelands Historical Society
Grover Cleveland Papers (1743 – 1945)
 Guide to the John Henry Wigmore (1863 – 1943) Papers
 Harvard Law Review 
 Harvard Law School Association
 Henry Hudson Memorial Park
Henry Hudson Monument
 Henry Hudson Monument Park
 Maine Historical Society
 Northern Westchester Hospital
 Pan-American Railway (The): Its Business Side
 Pan-American Railway:  Report of the Permanent Pan-American Railway Committee, July 1910
 Pennsylvania Railroad Technical & Historical Society (The)
 Rosa Bonheur
 Supreme Court of the United States
Theodore Roosevelt Papers (1759 – 1993): 
 Universal Funeral Chapel
 Western Reserve Historical Society
William Jennings Bryan and the Free Silver Movement

1947 deaths
1863 births
New York (state) lawyers
Harvard Law School alumni
Oberlin College alumni
Writers from New York City
Lawyers from New York City
Spuyten Duyvil, Bronx